Carrs Brook is a community overlooking the Bay of Fundy in the Canadian province of Nova Scotia, located in  Colchester County.

It is located on  Trunk 2 between the settlements of Lower Economy and Economy.

References

Communities in Colchester County
General Service Areas in Nova Scotia